Bishop Carroll Catholic High School (BCCHS) is a Catholic high school located in Ebensburg, Pennsylvania, in the United States. It is located in the Roman Catholic Diocese of Altoona-Johnstown. The school partners with All Saints Catholic School, Holy Name School, Northern Cambria Catholic School, Saint Bernard Regional Catholic School, Saint Benedict School, and Saint Michael School.

Curriculum
The school provides 60 dual-enrollment credits and seven AP courses. Bishop Carroll has partnerships with several Catholic universities, including Saint Francis University, Mount Aloysius College, Saint Vincent College, Duquesne University, Franciscan University, and others, that allow for discounts for BCCHS graduates and placement options. BCCHS also has a partnership with Admiral Peary Vo-Tech.

Athletics
The school sponsors nearly 20 athletic teams, with most competing in the Laurel Highlands Athletic Conference. Sports teams include:

References

External links
 
 The Roman Catholic Diocese of Altoona

Catholic secondary schools in Pennsylvania
Educational institutions established in 1959
Schools in Cambria County, Pennsylvania
1959 establishments in Pennsylvania